Wiley Interdisciplinary Reviews (abbreviated WIREs) is a set of peer-reviewed scientific journals that each publish interdisciplinary review articles on high-profile topics. The series was established in 2009 and is published by Wiley-Blackwell. Each journal publishes new review articles every month.
The journal series won the 2009 R.R. Hawkins Award from the Association of American Publishers.

Journals
Wiley Interdisciplinary Reviews: Climate Change
Wiley Interdisciplinary Reviews: Cognitive Science
Wiley Interdisciplinary Reviews: Computational Molecular Science
Wiley Interdisciplinary Reviews: Computational Statistics
Wiley Interdisciplinary Reviews: Data Mining and Knowledge Discovery
Wiley Interdisciplinary Reviews: Developmental Biology
Wiley Interdisciplinary Reviews: Energy and Environment
Wiley Interdisciplinary Reviews: Forensic Science 
Wiley Interdisciplinary Reviews: Membrane Transport and Signaling
Wiley Interdisciplinary Reviews: Nanomedicine and Nanobiotechnology
Wiley Interdisciplinary Reviews: RNA
Wiley Interdisciplinary Reviews: Systems Biology and Medicine
Wiley Interdisciplinary Reviews: Water

References

External links

Academic journal series
Publications established in 2009
Wiley-Blackwell academic journals